The Aluniș is a river in Romania, left tributary of the Călata. It flows into the Călata near Brăișoru.

References

Rivers of Romania
Rivers of Cluj County